The 1984–85 Drexel Dragons men's basketball team represented Drexel University  during the 1984–85 NCAA Division I men's basketball season. The Dragons, led by 8th year head coach Eddie Burke, played their home games at the Daskalakis Athletic Center and were members of the East Coast Conference (ECC).

The team finished the season 10–18, and finished in 2nd place in the ECC in the regular season.

In the 1984–85 season, freshman guard Michael Anderson set the school records at the time for points in a season by a freshman (393), assists in a season (137), seals in a season (84), and assists in a game by a freshman (11, vs Delaware on February 2). He also tied the team record for free throws made and in attempted in a game (18 and 23 respectively, vs Northwestern Louisiana).

Roster

Junior Center Charles Hickman left the team during the season for academic reasons

Schedule

|-
!colspan=9 style="background:#F8B800; color:#002663;"| Exhibition
|-

|-
!colspan=9 style="background:#F8B800; color:#002663;"| Regular season
|-

|-
!colspan=12 style="background:#FFC600; color:#07294D;"| ECC Tournament
|-

Awards
Michael Anderson
ECC All–Conference Second Team
ECC All–Rookie Team
Basketball Times All-Freshman team honorable mention
Ragin' Cajuns' Budweiser Bayou Classic All-Tournament team

Charles Hickman
Orange Bowl Classic All-Tournament team

References

Drexel Dragons men's basketball seasons
Drexel
1984 in sports in Pennsylvania
1985 in sports in Pennsylvania